Eneström is a surname, likely of Swedish origin. Notable people with the surname include:

Anna Karin Eneström, Swedish diplomat
Gustaf Eneström (1852-1923), Swedish mathematician, statistician, and historian

See also
Enstrom